SS America may refer to:

 , a passenger steamer for North German Lloyd, 1863–1894
 , a passenger steamer for Pacific Mail Steamship Company
 , a cargo ship that was in Chilean service in 1928, formerly known as the George W. Elder.
 , a passenger cargo vessel by J & G Thomson Clydebank, launched 29 December 1893, later used by the Italian Navy as Trinacria and as a Royal Yacht, scrapped 1925.
 , a sailing barque (painted by William H. Yorke).
 , a passenger and package steamer serving Duluth, Minnesota, Thunder Bay, Ontario, and Isle Royale.
 , originally the Hamburg America Line liner Amerika seized by the United States in 1917; served as a troop transport in World War I; transferred to the United States Shipping Board; eventually assigned to United States Lines
 , an Italian liner for Navigazione Generale Italiana in Italy–New York service; transported American troops during World War I; in South American service, from 1924; scrapped 1928
 , a cargo steamer for Norge Mexico Gulf Linjen; sunk by torpedo in 1915
 , an ocean liner of the United States Lines, launched 1939; sold to the Greek company Chandris Group in 1964; wrecked 1994

See also
 America (disambiguation)
 , winner of the first America's Cup
 
 
 
 
 RMS America
 
 

Ship names